Aram Grigoryan (born 3 September 1992) is a Russian judoka. He is the gold medallist in the -60 kg at the 2014 Judo Grand Prix Qingdao

References

External links
 
 

1992 births
Living people
Russian male judoka
21st-century Russian people